Martin Rösel (born on September 8, 1961 in Essen) is a German protestant theologian of Old Testament and professor at the University of Rostock.

Life

Education 

In 1993 he received his doctorate in University of Hamburg and was then Academic Councilor for Hebrew and Old Testament at the University of Rostock. From 1999 he holds his habilitation in Old Testament earned at the University of Hamburg.

Teaching 

In 2007 he was awarded the title of professor by the University of Hamburg and in 2010 he was rehabilitated at the University of Rostock.

Research 

His research focuses on the processing of the Book of Numbers, the Book of Daniel, the translation of the Septuagint into German and collaboration on the project "Episteme der Theologie Interreligios", which is intended to promote interreligious dialogue.

Bibliography

Theses

Books

Articles

References 

Living people
1961 births
Old Testament scholars
20th-century Protestant theologians
21st-century Protestant theologians
Academic staff of the University of Rostock
Academic staff of the University of Hamburg